Alpman is a Turkish surname. It may refer to:

Ayten Alpman (1929–2012), Turkish female jazz and pop singer
Fatma Serpil Alpman (born 1950), Turkish female diplomat and former ambassador

Turkish-language surnames
Surnames of Turkish origin